This list of city nicknames in Wisconsin compiles the aliases, sobriquets and slogans that Wisconsin's cities and towns are known by (or have been known by historically), officially and unofficially, to municipal governments, local people, outsiders or their tourism boards or chambers of commerce. City nicknames can help in establishing a civic identity, helping outsiders recognize a community or attracting people to a community because of its nickname; promote civic pride; and build community unity. Nicknames and slogans that successfully create a new community "ideology or myth" are also believed to have economic value. Their economic value is difficult to measure, but there are anecdotal reports of cities that have achieved substantial economic benefits by "branding" themselves by adopting new slogans.

Some unofficial nicknames are positive, while others are derisive. The unofficial nicknames listed here have been in use for a long time or have gained wide currency.

Nicknames by city

A
Algoma 
Wisconsin's Trout and Salmon Capital
Warm Welcomes, Cool Breezes and Hot Fishing
Allenton – You Have Friends in Allenton
Alma Center – Strawberry Capital of Wisconsin
Amery – City of Lakes
Arbor Vitae/Woodruff – Crossroads of the North
Ashland – Ashland Tops Wisconsin

B
Babcock – The Cranberry Pie Capital
Baldwin – The Biggest Little Town in Wisconsin
Baraboo
Circus City of the World
Gem City
Barron – Turkey Capital of Wisconsin
Bayfield – Best Kept Secret in Wisconsin
Bear Creek – Home of the World's Largest Sauerkraut Plant
Beaver Dam – Beaver Dam – Make Yourself at Home
Belleville – UFO Capital of the World
Belmont – Home of the First Territorial Capital
Beloit – Gateway to Wisconsin
Berlin – Fur and Leather Capital
Birchwood – Bluegill Capital of Wisconsin
Black Creek 
Birthplace of the First Organized National Baseball Team
Crossroads to  the Northwoods
Black Earth – The Only Black Earth in the World
Black River Falls – Deer Capital of Wisconsin
Blanchardville – The Village in the Valley
Bloomer – Rope Jump Capital of the World
Blue River – Heart of the Lower Wisconsin River
Bonduel – Spelling Capital of Wisconsin
Boscobel
Birthplace of the Gideon Bible
Turkey Hunting Capital of Wisconsin
Boulder Junction – Musky Capital of the World
Boyceville – Cucumber Capital of Wisconsin
Boyd – The Friendly Town – Why Go By
Brodhead – The Bicycle Gateway to Wisconsin
Burlington – Chocolate City, USA

C
Cambridge – The Umbrella City
Cassville – Where History, Bald Eagles and the Mississippi Meet
Cedarburg – Historic Cedarburg
Chippewa Falls – Naturally the World's Purest Water
Clam Lake – Heart of the Chequamegon National Forest
Clintonville – The Good Life Unlimited
Colby – Home of Colby Cheese
Columbus – Red Bud City
Combined Locks
Headwaters Vacationland
Conservation, Protection, Preservation
Cornell – Stacker City
Cornucopia – Wisconsin's northernmost Post Office
Cross Plains – Famous For Friendliness
Cuba City – The City of Presidents
Cumberland
Rutabaga Capital
The Island City

D
Darlington – The Pearl of the Pecatonica, U.S.A.
Delavan – Clown Town, U.S.A
Dickeyville – Home of the Famous Dickeyville Grotto
Dodgeville – At the heart of it all
Dousman – Bullfrog Station

E
Eagle River
Snowmobile Capital of the World
Wisconsin's Cranberry Country
Eau Claire
Music Capital of the North
Horseradish Capital of the World
Kubb Capital of North America
Eden – Hometown of Baseball Star Jim Gantner
Edgar – Progressive Village Serving People
Edgerton – Tobacco City
Elkhorn
The Christmas Card City
Living in Harmony
Ellsworth – Cheese Curd Capital of Wisconsin
Elmwood – UFO Capital of the World
Ephraim – The Pearl of the Peninsula
Ettrick – Fun City, USA
Evansville – Soybean Capital of Wisconsin
Exeland – Trout Fishing Capital of Wisconsin

F
Fennimore – Fennimore..."The City on the Move!"
Florence County – Heart of Wild Rivers Country
Fond du Lac – Winners Choice 
Forest Junction – You Can Get There From Here
Fox Cities – Refreshing Change of Place
Fox Lake – Home of Bunny Berigan
Francis Creek – A Nice Place to Live
Fremont – White Bass Capital of the WorldClaims to Fame - Fish, Epodunk, accessed April 16, 2007

G
Galesville – Garden of Eden
Gays Mills – The Apple Capital of Wisconsin
Germantown 
Deutschstadt
Gateway to Washington County
Gleason – Brook Trout Fishing Capital of the World
Glidden – Black Bear Capital of the World
Grantsburg – Home of Big Gust
Green Bay
Titletown USA
Toilet paper Capital of the World
Packertown
Green Lake – Wisconsin's Lake Trout Capital

H
Haugen – Kolache Capital
Hayward – Home of World Record Muskies
Hazel Green – Point of Beginning
Hillsboro – Czech Capital of Wisconsin
Holmen – Yes, Holmen
Horicon – Home of the Horicon Marsh
Hurley – Where 51 Ends...Family Fun Begins

J
Janesville
Bower City
City of Parks
Wisconsin's Park Place
Jefferson – The Gemütlichkeit City
Jim Falls – Biggest Little Town on the River
Johnson Creek – Crossroads With a Future
Juda – Buffalo Roast Capital of Wisconsin
Juneau – Birthplace of Addie Joss (Baseball Hall of Fame pitcher)

K
Kaukauna – The Electric CityDid You Know? Facts About the City of Kaukauna, Wisconsin 
Kenosha – Kenosha...For All Seasons
Kewaskum – Gateway to the Kettle Moraine State Forest
Kewaunee – Kewaunee – Spirit of the Lakeshore

L
La Crosse – God's Country. Mud City, USA
Lac du Flambeau – Lake of Torches
Lake Geneva – Enjoyed for Over 100 Years by the Rich & Famous
Lake Tomahawk – Snowshoe Baseball Capital of the World
Lancaster – City of the Dome
Land O' Lakes – Land of Four Seasons Fun
Langlade County – Wisconsin's Get-Away County
Lodi – Home of Susie the Duck
Lone Rock – Coldest Spot in the Nation (With the Warmest Heart)

M
Madison
Mad City
Madtown
City of Four LakesMadison Metropolitan School District 
Manitowish Waters – Wisconsin's Northwoods Year-Round Vacationland
Manitowoc
Wisconsin's Maritime Capital
Manty
Clipper City
Skunk Hollow
Marinette – Marinette County Waterfalls Capital of Wisconsin
Marshfield
The City in the Center
Cheese City USA
Mayville – Jayville
Mazomanie – Turn-of-the-Century Railroad Town
Medford – People, Pride and Progress
Menasha (city) – Menasha on the Move
Menasha (town) – Bridging the Fox Cities
Menomonie – Traditional Yet Progressive
Mercer – Loon Capital of the World
Merrill – Enjoy the Merrill Advantage
Middleton – The Good Neighbor City
Milton – History in Progress
Milwaukee
Brew City/Brew Town/The Brew
City of Festivals
Cream City
The German Athens of America
A Great Place on a Great Lake
Mil-town
Mineral Point – The City Where Wisconsin Began
Minocqua – The Island City
Monona – City of Pride, and It Shows
Monroe – Swiss Cheese Capital of the U.S.A
Montfort – Home of the Fort
Mt. Horeb – The Troll Capital
Muscoda – Morel Mushroom Capital of Wisconsin

N
New Auburn – Gateway to the Ice Age Park
New Berlin – City Living with a Touch of Country., 
New Glarus – America's Little Switzerland
New Holstein – Cow Town, USA
New London – Heart of Wolf River Country
New Richmond – The City Beautiful
Norwalk – The Black Squirrel Capital of the World

O
Oak Creek – Where City Meets The Country
Oconomowoc – A Special Place
Oconto – Oconto – History on the Bay
Omro – Bridge to the Future
Onalaska – Sunfish Capital of the World
Oregon – Horse Capital of Wisconsin
Oshkosh
Oshkosh on the Water 
Wisconsin's Event City

 P 
Palmyra – Heartbeat of the Kettle Moraine
Pardeeville – Home of the World Watermelon Eating and Seed Spitting Championships
Park Falls – Ruffed Grouse Capital of the WorldClaims to Fame - Birds, Epodunk, accessed April 16, 2007
Peshtigo – Home of the Great Peshtigo Fire
Phelps – Headwaters County (Start of Wisconsin River)
Phillips
 We've Saved a Place for You!
 Trophy Whitetail Capital
Pittsville – Exact Geographical Center of the State
Platteville – Home of the Chicago Bears Summer Training Camp
Plover – Golden Sands Area
Plum City – A Small Village in a Peaceful Valley
Plymouth – The Cream of Wisconsin
Poniatowski – The Center of the Northwestern World
Port Washington 
Picturesque Port Washington
Jewel of the Lake Michigan Shore
Portage
Historic Portage
Potosi-Tennyson – Catfish Capital of Wisconsin
Prairie du Chien – Wisconsin's Second Oldest Settlement (Where Great Rivers Meet)
Prescott – Where the Mighty Mississippi Meets the Beautiful St. Croix River
Presque Isle
Walleye Capital of the World
Wisconsin's Last Wilderness
Price County – We've Saved a Place for You
Princeton – Princeton on the Fox – Where Yesterday Meets Tomorrow
Pulaski – Polka Town

R
Racine
Kringle Capital of the World
The Belle City
Randolph – A Great Place to Grow
Redgranite – Home of the State Rock
Reedsburg – Butter Capital of America
Rhinelander – Home of the Hodag
Richland Center – From Farming to Frank Lloyd Wright
Ripon – Birthplace of the Republican Party

S
Sauk City/Prairie du Sac – Cow Chip Throwing Capital of Wisconsin
Saukville – Saukville Will Work for You
Sayner-Star Lake – The Birthplace of the SnowmobileA local mechanic and businessman built the first workable snowmobile in his shop in Sayner (About Plum Lake Township , Sayner-Star Lake Chamber of Commerce website, accessed July 26, 2008)
Seymour – Home of the Hamburger
Sheboygan
Bratwurst Capital of the World
The City of Cheese, Chairs, and Children
Shiocton – Where Nature Begins
Siren – Lilac Capital of Wisconsin
Soldiers Grove – America's First Solar Village
Somerset – Tubing Capital of the World
Sparta – Bicycling Capital of America
Spencer – A Friendly Small Town with a Future
Spooner – Crossroads of the North
Spring Valley – Home of the Largest Earthen Dam in the Midwest
St. Germain
The Friendliest Town in the Northwoods
All Trails Lead to St. Germain
Birthplace of Colorama
Stevens Point – See Our Point of View
Gateway to the Pineries
Stockbridge – Sturgeon Center of the World
Stoughton – The City of Progress and Opportunity
Stratford – Stratford on the Move
Sun Prairie – The Groundhog Capital of the WorldClaims to Fame - Animals, Epodunk, accessed April 16, 2007
Superior
Where Sail Meets Rail
I'm a Superior Lover
Soup Town
The Twin Ports (with Duluth, Minnesota).

T
Taycheedah – Sheepshead Fishing Capital of the World
Tilden – Halfway Between the North Pole and the Equator
Tomah 
Where the I Divides
Gateway to Cranberry Country
Tomahawk – Gateway to the Northwoods
Trego – The Wild River City
Two Rivers
Birthplace of the Ice Cream Sundae
Coolest Spot in Wisconsin or the Cool City

V
Verona – Hometown USA
Viroqua – Viroqua Quality – Discover It

W
Warrens – The Cranberry Capital of Wisconsin
Watertown – Home of the First Kindergarten in America
Waukesha 
Spring City
Birthplace of Les Paul
Waunakee – The Only Waunakee in the World
Waupaca – Chain-O-Lakes
Waupun
City of Sculpture
Prison City
Wild Goose Center of Wisconsin
Wausau – Our Peak Season Never Ends
Wausaukee – Ranger City USA
Wautoma – Christmas Tree Capital of the World
Wauwatosa – Tosa
Webster – The Fishbowl of Wisconsin
Weyauwega – Home of Horse and Buggy Days
Whitefish Bay – Whitefolks Bay
Wild Rose – The Land of Lakes and Streams
Wilton – The Heart of the Trail
Winchester – Wisconsin's Unchanged Wilderness
Winneconne – Winneconne on the Wolf
Wisconsin Dells – Waterpark Capital of the World (commercial, trademarked)
Wisconsin Rapids – Paper City
Wonewoc
Midpoint of the 400 Trail
We Are User Friendly
Woodman – The Dinky's Last Stop
Woodruff – Home of the Million Penny Parade

See also
List of city nicknames in the United States
List of cities in Wisconsin
List of towns in Wisconsin
List of villages in Wisconsin

References

External links
a list of American and a few Canadian nicknames
U.S. cities list

Wisconsin cities and towns
Populated places in Wisconsin
City nicknames